Knuuttila is a Finnish surname. Notable people with this surname include:
Anselm Knuuttila (1903–1968), Finnish cross-country skier
Petra Knuuttila and Tarja Knuuttila (badminton), 1982 winners of women's doubles at Finnish National Badminton Championships
Tarja Knuuttila (born 1960), Finnish philosopher
 (born 1963), Finnish musician, drummer for Musta Paraati

Finnish-language surnames